Aegialiinae is a small subfamily of the family Scarabaeidae (scarab beetles). Historically the group has been treated as a tribe within a broad definition of the subfamily Aphodiinae.

Genera 
 Aegialia 
 Amerisaprus 
 Argeremazus 
 Caelius 
 Micraegialia 
 Mimaegialia 
 Rhysothorax 
 Saprus 
 Silluvia

References

Further reading

External links

External links
 

Beetle subfamilies
Scarabaeidae
Taxa named by François-Louis Laporte, comte de Castelnau